1,3-Dithietane is a dithietane. It is a colorless, crystalline, unpleasant-smelling solid. It was first prepared in 1976 by the reaction of bis(chloromethyl) sulfoxide with sodium sulfide to give  1,3-dithietane 1-oxide, followed by THF-borane reduction.

Examples of compounds bearing this functional group include the antibiotic Cefotetan and the pesticide Fosthietan.

References

Dithietanes